Angely or Angély is a French name that may refer to:

People
 Anthony Angély (born 1990), Martiniquais footballer
 Barbara Angely, stage name of Barbara Warren (1943-2008), Austrian-American model and triathlete
 Louis Angely (1787-1835), German actor

Places
 Angely, Yonne, Bourgogne-Franche-Comté, France
 Saint-Jean-d'Angély, Charente-Maritime, France